Dreams is an album by Hungarian guitarist Gábor Szabó featuring performances recorded in 1968 and released on the Skye label. The design was made by David Stahlberg, and features artwork by English illustrator John Austen entitled "Vision".

Reception
The Allmusic review states: "a collection of originals, pop covers, and classical reinterpretations. The result is a sort of accessible third-stream music. Szabo has many fine moments".

Track listing
All compositions by Gábor Szabó, except as indicated.
 "Galatea's Guitar" – 5:33
 "Half the Day is the Night" (Gary McFarland) – 4:23
 "Song of Injured Love" (Manuel de Falla) – 4:05
 "The Fortune Teller" (Gábor Szabó, Louis Kabok) – 4:28
 "Fire Dance" (Falla) – 5:39
 "The Lady in the Moon" – 5:13
 "Ferris Wheel" (Donovan Leitch) – 5:27
Recorded in Los Angeles, California on 6, 7, 9 August 1968 with overdubs recorded in New York City on 22 August 1968.

Personnel
 Gábor Szabó – guitar
 Jim Stewart – guitar
 Louis Kabok – bass
 Jim Keltner – drums
 Hal Gordon – percussion
 Tony Miranda, Ray Alonge, Brooks Tillotson – French horn
 Julius Schacter – violin
 George Ricci – cello 
 Gary McFarland – piano, arranger

References

Skye Records albums
Gábor Szabó albums
1968 albums
Albums arranged by Gary McFarland
Albums produced by Gary McFarland